The general strike of 1932 was a major strike which broke out in Belgium on 7 July 1932. It began after a spontaneous strike by coal miners in the Borinage and involved communist agitation amid a severe decrease in living standards and real wages, as well as high unemployment, caused by the Great Depression. Two people were killed during the strike which only ended on 9 September 1932.

The strike served as the inspiration for the 1934 documentary film Misère au Borinage directed by Henri Storck and Joris Ivens.

Further reading

External links
La Grève générale de 1932. 'Qu’est ce que cette grève du Borinage sinon le peuple ouvrier qui se met en colère ?' by Colette Hubert (Centre d'animation et de recherche en histoire ouvrière et populaire).

1932 Belgian_general_strike
1932 in Belgium
Great Depression
Socialism in Belgium
Communism in Belgium
July 1932 events
1932 labor disputes and strikes
August 1932 events
September 1932 events